Thanasimus is a genus of checkered beetles in the family Cleridae. There are about six described species in Thanasimus.

Species
These six species belong to the genus Thanasimus:
 Thanasimus dubius (Fabricius, 1776) i c g b (dubious checkered beetle)
 Thanasimus femoralis (Zetterstedt, 1828) g
 Thanasimus formicarius (Linnaeus, 1758) g b (European red-bellied clerid)
 Thanasimus repandus (Horn, 1871) i c g
 Thanasimus trifasciatus (Say, 1825) i c g b
 Thanasimus undatulus (Say, 1835) i c g b
Data sources: i = ITIS, c = Catalogue of Life, g = GBIF, b = Bugguide.net

External links

 

Cleridae genera
Clerinae